The Ukrainian orthography of 1928, also Orthography of Kharkiv is the Ukrainian orthography of the Ukrainian language, adopted in 1927 by voting at the All-Ukrainian spelling conference, which took place in the then capital of the Ukrainian SSR, in the city of Kharkiv, with the participation of representatives of Ukrainian lands, which were then part of different states.

Mykola Skrypnyk, the People's Commissar for Education, officially approved the Ukrainian orthography of 1928 on September 6, 1928, which is why this orthography is also called Orthography of Skrypnyk, or Skrypnykivka. The main linguist-ideologist of this orthography was Hryhorii Holoskevych, who compiled and published in 1929 the Orthographic Dictionary, which in practice showed all the innovations of the new orthography of 1928, so this orthography is sometimes called Orthography of Holoskevych. Already on March 31, 1929, it was approved by the Ukrainian Academy of Sciences, and on May 29 by the Shevchenko Scientific Society in Lviv, Republic of Poland.
The compilers of the Ukrainian orthography of 1928 were well-known Ukrainian linguists, most of whom were later repressed and their careers destroyed by the Stalinist regime, such as Ahatanhel Krymskyi, Leonid Bulakhovskyi, Olena Kurylo, Oleksa Syniavskyi, Yevhen Tymchenko, Mykola Hrunskyi, Vsevolod Hantsov, Mykola Nakonechnyi, Hryhorii Holoskevych, Borys Tkachenko and others. Members of the spelling commission were such Ukrainian writers as Maik Yohansen, Serhii Yefremov, Mykola Khvyliovyi, Mykhailo Yalovyi and others.

Today, the Ukrainian orthography of 1928 is used by the Ukrainian diaspora in a large part of its publications, the most famous of which is the oldest Ukrainian-language magazine, Svoboda, which is still published. It has been used by some modern Ukrainian authors, literary editors, and Ukrainian linguists, including Iryna Farion, Sviatoslav Karavanskyi, Oleksandr Ponomariv, and Mykola Zubkov, who are the most ardent defenders and propagandists of the Orthography of Kharkiv.

From 2000 to 2013,Ukrainian commercial television network STB TV used certain rules of this spelling together with the draft Ukrainian orthography of 1999 in the news program "Vikna".

The press service of the All-Ukrainian Union "Freedom" uses the rules of Ukrainian orthography of 1928.

History 

In 1926, the draft of the Ukrainian orthography was published for discussion. The preface said:From the state commission at the NGO to streamline the Ukrainian orthography 
Among the participants in the All-Ukrainian Spelling Conference held in Kharkiv in 1927 were 4 high-ranking officials of the People's Commissariat, 5 academicians, 28 university professors of linguistics and philology, 8 teachers, 7 journalists and 8 writers. Three representatives of Western Ukraine also took part: Kyrylo Studynskyi, Ilarion Svientsitskyi, Vasyl Simovych.

The conference approved a new spelling code, with the exception of a few rules: this primarily concerned the debatable rules for writing letters to represent the phonemes //-// and //-//, because it was around them that the greatest controversy arose. The conference elected the presidium of the Spelling Commission consisting of 5 people, which in 1928 adopted a compromise decision on the rules of discussion: the Galician and Dnieper traditions of the Ukrainian language were taken into account. This decision, however, was not unequivocally approved by the orthographers. In particular, Ahatangel Krymskyi considered concessions to the Galician orthography to be speculation and political flirtation between Skrypnyk and the Galicians, and the Galician orthography itself was outdated.

The orthography was printed and distributed in 1929 - since then all schools and publishing houses of the Ukrainian SSR were obliged to adhere to it. For the sake of the unity of the Ukrainian literary language, the leadership of the Shevchenko Scientific Society in Lviv decided to adhere to the norms of the new spelling in Galicia.

All further changes in the Ukrainian orthography were developed on behalf of the government by specially created orthographic commissions. In 1933, a orthography commission headed by A. Khvylia (Olinter), which was destroyed by the Stalinist regime in 1938, reworked the Ukrainian Spelling, recognizing the norms of 1927-1928 as "nationalist." On October 4, 1937, a critical article appeared in the newspaper Pravda, according to which the Ukrainian language should be brought closer to Russian.

After that, the Politburo of the Central Committee of the CP (B) U adopted a resolution according to which:«Consider it necessary to publish in the pages of the newspaper "Communist" a detailed, detailed critique of the distortions and errors made in the "Dictionary", in particular regarding the use of Polish and other foreign words in the Ukrainian language, while to denote new concepts are closer and familiar to Ukrainian folk n words. Instruct the commission to consider all the corrections that will need to be made to the dictionary».But some norms that were rejected due to their absence in the Russian orthography were returned to the Ukrainian orthography of 2019.

Differences

Phonetics and spelling

Lexicology

In the works 
Representatives of the literature of the "Executed Renaissance" and some of their successors used the Ukrainian orthography of 1928 in their works. As an example, we can cite an excerpt from a poem by Oleh Olzhych "Заходить сонце. Кане тишина...":

Vasyl Stus also quite successfully showed in his poems the specific features of the Ukrainian language:

Some features of a similar transfer of Ukrainian phonemes are witnessed in the classics of the XIX century:

Current state 
In the early 1990s, some linguists and politicians called for the restoration of at least some of Kharkiv's orthography. For the first time many books of emigrants were published in Ukraine, and it was in Ukrainian orthography of 1928. Several dictionaries that used this spelling were published without permission. However, of all the proposals, only the restoration of the letter "ґ" was accepted, which in 1933 was declared "nationalist" and removed without any discussion.For some time since 2000, the Ukrainian orthography of 1928 has been used by Channels 1+1, ICTV and Channel 1 of the national radio, and then until 2013 STB used separate rules of this spelling together with the "draft Ukrainian orthography of 1999" in the news program "Vikna". At the same time, the Lviv publishing houses "Litopys", "Misioner", "Svichado", "Zhurnal fizychnykh doslidzhennia", as well as Kyiv's "Sovremennost", "Krytyka" worked according to the key norms of Ukrainian orthography of 1928.

From 2008 to 2020, Ukrainian linguist Professor Oleksandr Ponomariv answered readers' questions every week, using elements of the Ukrainian orthography of 1928.

In 2012, the Russian social network Vkontakte, which is currently banned in Ukraine, founded the «Classic Ukrainian Spelling» community, which actively fought for the return of specific Ukrainian norms. In 2017, community founders Andrii Bondar, Oleksii Deikun and Rostyslav Dziuba translated Vkontakte into the Ukrainian orthography of 1928. Due to the restoration of some norms of the Ukrainian orthography of 1928 in the Ukrainian orthography of 2019", the above-mentioned community was renamed "Language in Time", which is now a popular page of news about the Ukrainian language, its protection and approval.

On May 22, 2019, a new version of the "Ukrainian orthography" was approved, which returned some items of the Ukrainian orthography of 1928, most of which are in a variant form. Naturally, the new orthography has been condemned by some Ukrainian linguists who advocate an officially unapproved draft in the late 1990s and early 2000s. According to Iryna Farion, it is the closest to the Ukrainian orthography of 1928.

See also 

 Ukrainian orthography of 1933
 Ukrainian orthography of 2019
 Ukrainian orthography
 Narkamaŭka

References

Further reading 

 Український правопис / Народній комісаріят освіти. — Вид.1-е. — [Харків]: Держ. вид-во України, 1929. — [2], 103, [1] c.
 Голоскевич Г. Правописний словник (за нормами правопису Всеукраїнської Академії Наук). — Харків, 1929.
 Німчук В. Проблеми українського правопису в XX ст.
 Огієнко І. Історія української літературної мови. Частина третя. Стан української літературної мови // XVIII. Історія українського правопису. — Київ, 2001.
 Підсумки правописної дискусії М. Скрипник // Вісті ВУЦВК. — 1927. — 19 червня.
 Порівняння правописів 1929 та 1993 років.
 Синявський О. Коротка історія «Українського правопису» // Культура українського слова. — Збірник І. — Харків — Київ, 1931. — С. 93—112. (те ж саме ще й тут)
 Синявський О. Норми української літературної мови. — Київ, Львів, 1929–1940.
 Скрипниківський правопис: історія прийняття // UaModna. — 9 вересня 2015.
 Українська мова у XX сторіччі: історія лінгвоциду: Док. і матеріали / Упоряд. Л. Масенко та ін. — К. : Вид. дім «Києво-Могилянська академія», 2005. — 399 с. — ISBN 966-518-314-1.
 Юрій Шевельов Про критерії в питаннях українського офіційного правопису / Ю. Шевельов. Вибрані праці: У 2 кн. — К., 2008. — Кн. 1. Мовознавство.
 Український правопис/ К: Фоліо, 2020 р. ISBN 9789660388734

External links 

 The text of the Ukrainian orthography of 1928
 Community of supporters of Ukrainian orthography of 1928 in Facebook

1927 in Ukraine
History of Ukraine (1918–1991)
1920s
Ukrainian orthography
Ukrainian language
Orthography reform